Hamisi Shaban Taletale, also known as Babu Tale (born 31 December 1982), is a Tanzanian talent manager and a politician presently serving as the Chama Cha Mapinduzi's Member of Parliament for Morogoro South constituency since November 2020. He is the co-founder of the WCB Wasafi music label.

Career 
Tale represents artists including Diamond Platnumz, Madee, Rayvanny, Mbosso, Rich Mavoko, and Dogo Janja. Through Rayvanny, Tale was the first manager to bring BET Award wins to Tanzania and the first in Africa to win MTV Europe Music Awards for both "Best African Act" and "Worldwide Act" through Diamond Platnumz's win in 2015.

In 2017 he controversially endorsed an independent candidate for Embakasi seat.

In 2018 he was arrested and taken to Tanzania court of law for debts.

References

External links 

 

1982 births
Living people
Tanzanian entertainers
People from Dar es Salaam
Tanzanian Muslims
Talent managers
Tanzanian MPs 2020–2025
21st-century Tanzanian politicians
Chama Cha Mapinduzi politicians
Chama Cha Mapinduzi MPs